Fast & Furious (also known as The Fast and the Furious) is a media franchise centered on a series of action films that are largely concerned with street racing, heists, spies, and family. The franchise also includes short films, a television series, live shows, video games and theme park attractions. It is distributed by Universal Pictures.

The first film was released in 2001, starring Paul Walker, Vin Diesel, Michelle Rodriguez, and Jordana Brewster. Walker returned for 2 Fast 2 Furious (2003), also starring Tyrese Gibson and Ludacris. Diesel returned for a cameo in the third film, The Fast and the Furious: Tokyo Drift (2006), which starred Lucas Black and introduced a new cast, including Sung Kang. The original cast reunited for the fourth film, titled Fast & Furious (2009), incorporating Kang and introducing Gal Gadot. The fifth film, Fast Five (2011), integrated Gibson and Ludacris to the main cast of the franchise and added Dwayne Johnson.

Jason Statham was introduced in Fast & Furious 6 (2013) as the main antagonist for Furious 7 (2015), becoming a recurring character. The seventh film also added Nathalie Emmanuel to the main cast and was Walker's last appearance, after his death during its production. The eighth film, titled The Fate of the Furious (2017), introduced Charlize Theron as a recurring antagonist; it also marked the last appearance of Johnson in the main films, known collectivelly as The Fast Saga, who then starred alongside Statham in Hobbs & Shaw (2019), the first spin-off film in the franchise. F9 (2021) introduced John Cena as an antagonist, scheduled to reprise his role in the tenth film, Fast X (2023).

The franchise also includes two short films that bridge gaps between feature films, The Turbo Charged Prelude for 2 Fast 2 Furious (2003) and Los Bandoleros (2009).

Feature films

Short films

Notes

References

External links
Full cast and crew for The Fast and the Furious at IMDb
Full cast and crew for 2 Fast 2 Furious at IMDb
Full cast and crew for The Fast and the Furious: Tokyo Drift at IMDb
Full cast and crew for Fast & Furious at IMDb
Full cast and crew for Fast Five at IMDb
Full cast and crew for Fast & Furious 6 at IMDb
Full cast and crew for Furious 7 at IMDb
Full cast and crew for The Fate of the Furious at IMDb
Full cast and crew for Hobbs & Shaw at IMDb
Full cast and crew for F9 at IMDb
Full cast and crew for Fast X at IMDb
Full cast and crew for The Turbo Charged Prelude for 2 Fast 2 Furious at IMDb
Full cast and crew for Los Bandoleros at IMDb

Lists of actors by film series
Fast & Furious lists